Michael P. Walters (born July 16, 1956) is a North Carolina businessman and politician. He was appointed to a seat in the North Carolina Senate in 2009 to fill the vacancy caused by the resignation of Sen. David Weinstein (a fellow Democrat), and then was elected and re-elected to the Senate in 2010 and 2012. He chose not to run for another term in 2014. Walters has represented Senate District 13, including Columbus, Robeson and Hoke counties.

Committee assignments

2013-2014 session
Appropriations - Natural and Economic Resources
Agriculture/Environment/Natural Resources
Finance
Insurance
Pensions, Retirement, and Aging
State and Local Government
Transportation

2011-2012 session
Appropriations/Base Budget
Agriculture/Environment/Natural Resources
Finance
Insurance
Judiciary I
Pensions, Retirement, and Aging
State and Local Government
Redistricting

Electoral history

2012

2010

References

 Shiles, Bob. "Walters sworn in, gets to work" The Robesonian (Lumberton, N.C.) Archived from the original on July 15, 2011.

External links
Official site

1956 births
Living people
People from Fairmont, North Carolina
North Carolina State University alumni
21st-century American politicians
Democratic Party North Carolina state senators